The eighth season of the American television series Whose Line Is It Anyway? premiered on ABC Family on October 3, 2005, and concluded on December 15, 2007. This was the final season prior to the 2013 revival on The CW.

Cast

Recurring 
 Wayne Brady (17 episodes)
 Brad Sherwood (eight episodes)
 Greg Proops (five episodes)
 Denny Siegel (four episodes)
 Patrick Bristow (two episodes)
 Kathy Greenwood (two episodes)
 Chip Esten (one episode)
 Stephen Colbert (one episode)
 Ian Gomez (one episode)
 Jeff Davis (one episode)

Episodes 

"Winner(s)" of each episode as chosen by host Drew Carey are highlighted in italics. The winner would take his or her seat and call a sketch for Drew to perform (often with the help of the rest).

External links
Whose Line Is It Anyway? (U.S.) (a Titles & Air Dates Guide)
Mark's guide to Whose Line is it Anyway? - Episode Guide

Whose Line Is It Anyway?
2005 American television seasons
2006 American television seasons
2007 American television seasons